Athilpur railway station (Urdu and ) is located in Pakistan.

See also
 List of railway stations in Pakistan
 Pakistan Railways

References

Railway stations in Kasur District
Railway stations on Lodhran–Raiwind Line